"Inverting the Pyramid of Success" is the twelfth episode and season finale of the second season of the American sports comedy-drama television series Ted Lasso, based on the character played by Jason Sudeikis in a series of promos for NBC Sports' coverage of England's Premier League. It is the 22nd overall episode of the series and was written by main cast member Jason Sudeikis and executive producer Joe Kelly and directed by supervising producer Declan Lowney. It was released on Apple TV+ on October 8, 2021.

The series follows Ted Lasso, an American college football coach, who is unexpectedly recruited to coach a fictional English Premier League soccer team, AFC Richmond, despite having no experience coaching soccer. The team's owner, Rebecca Welton, hires Lasso hoping he will fail as a means of exacting revenge on the team's previous owner, Rupert, her unfaithful ex-husband. The previous season saw Rebecca change her mind on the club's direction and working Ted in saving it, although the club is relegated from the Premier League. In the episode, AFC Richmond faces Brentford F.C. in an effort to finally get promoted to the Premier League.

The episode received mixed reviews from critics; while some praised the resolution to Richmond's storyline, others criticized the episode for its over-abundance of subplots and rushed pacing. For his performance in the episode, Nick Mohammed was nominated for Outstanding Supporting Actress in a Comedy Series at the 74th Primetime Emmy Awards. Additionally, James Lance was nominated for Primetime Emmy Award for Outstanding Guest Actor in a Comedy Series nomination at the 74th Primetime Creative Arts Emmy Awards.

Plot
News about Ted (Jason Sudeikis) having a panic attack reaches the media, with some pundits wondering if he is fit for his position. Rebecca (Hannah Waddingham) and the club make it clear to Ted that they support him. Ted apologises to the team for not telling them the truth, but otherwise ignores the revelation, preferring to focus on their next game, which will determine if the club is promoted to the Premier League. That night, Beard (Brendan Hunt) tells Ted he knows that Nate (Nick Mohammed) was the anonymous source who reported his panic attack and must act accordingly.

Roy (Brett Goldstein) confronts Jamie (Phil Dunster) about him telling Keeley (Juno Temple) he still loves her. Jamie apologises for his actions, and to his surprise, Roy forgives him. Meanwhile Keeley informs Higgins (Jeremy Swift) that Bantr's VC wants to finance her own PR firm, but is nervous about telling Rebecca. Roy is delighted by the news, although he fears she will be less present for him. Roy and Keeley also discover that their Vanity Fair photoshoot omitted Roy from the article, although Roy claims he is not bothered. The next day, Keeley tells Rebecca she’s leaving to start her own firm, and Rebecca congratulates her. They are both surprised to discover that Rupert (Anthony Head) has bought West Ham United F.C.. 

On the day of the match against Brentford F.C., Roy admits to the "Diamond Dogs" that he felt hurt for being excluded from the photoshoot and is annoyed to have forgiven Jamie for confessing his love for Keeley. This prompts Nate to admit that he kissed Keeley. Roy already knew and forgives him without difficulty, annoying Nate. The first half ends with AFC Richmond losing 0-2, failing with their false 9 strategy. Nate wants to abandon the tactic, but the team decides to stick with it. After everyone heads back out onto the pitch, Ted confronts Nate about why he is mad at him. Nate reveals that Ted made him believe he was very important, only to abandon him since he joined the coaching staff. He tells Ted he wouldn't have got this far without Nate’s input, that he earned his place as a coach, and that Ted doesn’t belong here. He angrily rejects Ted’s apology, telling him he’s "full of shit", and storms out.

During the second half, Sam (Toheeb Jimoh) scores a goal, just as added time begins. In the final minute, Dani (Cristo Fernández) scores a goal via penalty, which gives the team a draw - enough to promote them to the Premier League. As the team celebrates, Ted finds that Nate has torn up the "Believe" sign in the locker room and left without a word to the team. Meeting with Akufo (Sam Richardson), Sam declines his offer, which angers Akufo, who claims Sam will never play in the Nigeria national football team. Sam tells Ted and Rebecca that his decision was based on his journey, feeling he still has more left on the club.

After facing the press about the game and his mental health, Ted runs into Trent Crimm (James Lance), who tells Ted he was fired from The Independent after coming clean to his editor about revealing an anonymous source. Despite losing his job, he remains optimistic for his future and wishes Ted good luck in the next season. Roy surprises Keeley with tickets for an overseas holiday, but while Keeley is delighted she turns it down to remain in London and work on her new firm. She tells him to not waste the journey and go alone. Sam buys a space where he intends to open a Nigerian cuisine restaurant. Two months later, in the London Stadium, the West Ham United F.C. players are training, while Rupert whispers something to a member of the coaching staff. The person turns, revealing himself to be Nate.

Development

Production
The episode was directed by supervising producer Declan Lowney and written by main cast member Jason Sudeikis and executive producer Joe Kelly. This was Lowney's sixth directing credit, Sudeikis' fifth writing credit, and Kelly's seventh writing credit for the show.

Writing
The episode developed Nate's character, by having him admit his anger towards Ted and taking a job as a coach in West Ham United F.C.. Nick Mohammed knew fans of the series wouldn't like his character's progress through the season, explaining "He's making a series of bad decisions; he has issues with his dad; he feels insecure and abandoned. It's all been building to his conversation with Ted in the finale where he's able to express what he's feeling." As part of the character's descent, the crew decided to have Nate's hair slowly turn grey throughout the season.

Critical reviews
"Inverting the Pyramid of Success" received mixed reviews from critics. Myles McNutt of The A.V. Club gave the episode a "B-" and wrote, "'Inverting The Pyramid Of Success' — and the second season as a whole — was going for complicated and landed on confused. For every story being told, there were a collection of open questions as to why characters behaved in a certain way, but the show generally ignored these questions, or answered them offscreen in unsatisfying ways." 

Alan Sepinwall of Rolling Stone wrote, "The creative team's wanted to expand its focus beyond the Ted-Rebecca core, and to dig deep into both the impact Ted's positivity was having on the team and the limits of that positivity. That's admirable ambition, and a lot of it worked very well. But despite two additional episodes and longer running times every week, there wasn't always enough room to successfully execute those goals. And that struggle was palpable in these last few episodes. The believing is great, and vital to the experience of watching and loving Ted Lasso. But having a sound strategy mapped out in advance helps a lot, too. Nate's an ass, but he's not wrong about everything." 

Keith Phipps of Vulture gave the episode a 4 star rating out of 5 and wrote, "In some respects, 'Inverting the Pyramid of Success' illustrates just how Ted Lasso often doesn't have to be about Ted Lasso. Ted remains central to the story this week, but his season-long journey more or less ended with the preceding episodes." Becca Newton of TV Fanatic gave the episode a 4.5 star rating out of 5 and wrote, "It was the best of times - Richmond earned a promotion back to the Premier League. It was the worst of times - an unrepentant Nate managing Rupert's new football club. In other words, watching 'Inverting the Pyramid of Success' is like riding a rollercoaster - lots of ups and downs." 

Linda Holmes of NPR wrote, "The fact that not every effort to fill out the complexities of the feelings among all these characters succeeded at the very end doesn't make me wish they hadn't gone at this season with so many interesting ideas." Christopher Orr of The New York Times wrote, "After a dozen episodes, Season 2 of Ted Lasso is officially in the books. And viewers of the finale might be forgiven for, in the words of Yogi Berra, feeling déjà vu all over again."

Awards and accolades
Nick Mohammed submitted this episode for consideration for his Primetime Emmy Award for Outstanding Supporting Actor in a Comedy Series nomination at the 74th Primetime Emmy Awards. He lost the award to his co-star, Brett Goldstein.

Additionally, James Lance was nominated for Primetime Emmy Award for Outstanding Guest Actor in a Comedy Series nomination at the 74th Primetime Creative Arts Emmy Awards. He lost the award to Nathan Lane in Only Murders in the Building.

References

External links
 

Ted Lasso episodes
2021 American television episodes
Television episodes written by Jason Sudeikis